Euathlus affinis is a species of spider belonging to the family Theraphosidae (tarantulas). It is native to Chile.

Taxonomy
The species was first described in 1849 as Mygale affinis. However, Mygale had been used previously for a genus of mammals, and the correct name for the genus is Avicularia, making this species Avicularia affinis. It was subsequently transferred to Brachypelma in 1936 and then to Euathlus in 2017.

References

Theraphosidae
Spiders of South America
Spiders described in 1849
Endemic fauna of Chile